Puerto Rico Highway 862 (PR-862) is a north–south road located between the municipalities of Bayamón and Toa Alta, Puerto Rico.

Route description
It begins at its intersection with PR-861 in Pájaros barrio and ends at its junction with PR-864 in Hato Tejas area. This highway bring access to several communities and neighborhood developments between Pájaros, Mucarabones, Candelaria and Hato Tejas barrios.

Major intersections

See also

 List of highways numbered 862

References

862